The Bessemer Civic Center is a performing arts and convention center located in Bessemer, Alabama, a Birmingham suburb.  The Civic Center's main hall features  of main space.  A mezzanine measuring  overlooks the main hall and can be used for additional seating for events as well as dancing and banquets.  The main hall features a 45-by-37-foot permanent stage.  When used for concerts, boxing, or wrestling, the Civic Center can seat up to 2,000 (1,600 in the main hall, 400 in the mezzanine using retractable risers); as a banquet facility the main hall seats 1,000.  Conventions and trade shows are also held at the main hall.

See also
List of convention centers in the United States

External links
Bessemer Civic Center at Birmingham Convention and Visitors Bureau

Concert halls in the United States
Convention centers in Alabama
Indoor arenas in Alabama
Bessemer, Alabama
Buildings and structures in Jefferson County, Alabama
Music venues in Alabama
Boxing venues in the United States
Boxing in Alabama